Raasin McIntosh (born 29 April 1982, in Texas) is an Olympic hurdler and philanthropist. At the 2012 Summer Olympics, she competed in the Women's 400 metres hurdles.

She grew up in Houston and went on to attend the University of Texas on an athlete scholarship. She trained under a prominent track coach, Bev Kearney, and went on to represent the United States at the 2003 World Championships in Athletics. She was the winner of the 400 m hurdles at the 2003 USA Outdoor Track and Field Championships and was in the top three of both the 400 m and 100-meter hurdles at the NCAA Women's Outdoor Track and Field Championship that year.

She is CEO and Creative Director of Raasin in the Sun, a 501 c3 Non profit cultivating resilient communities through art and environmental initiatives. raasininthesun.org

References

Living people
1982 births
Track and field athletes from Houston
American female hurdlers
Liberian female hurdlers
Olympic athletes of Liberia
Athletes (track and field) at the 2012 Summer Olympics
World Athletics Championships athletes for the United States
American LGBT sportspeople
Liberian LGBT sportspeople
LGBT track and field athletes
Lesbian sportswomen
21st-century American women
American philanthropists